Stephen Meehan   is an Australian professional rugby union football coach. He is currently an assistant coach at Toulon in the Top 14 competition in France, and was formerly in charge of Bath Rugby in the English Premiership. He was head coach of the Queensland Country team for the inaugural season of Australia's National Rugby Championship in 2014.

Early life
Stephen Meehan grew up in Brisbane, the second youngest of six. He attended Marist College Ashgrove in the 1980s, along with brothers Bryan, Kevin and David. The college, which also produced John Eales and Matthew Hayden, was a hothouse of ideas on running rugby. The first team was coached by former Wallaby centre Barry Honan and his mantra – "running and passing as opposed to kicking" – was a major influence on Meehan's ideas about rugby.

Coaching
Meehan began his coaching career in Queensland in 1999, working variously as Queensland Reds Under 19 selector, head coach of the Brisbane representative team, Combined States Under 19 backs coach, and head coach of the Brisbane Cyclone team when they became the East Coast Series champions.

From July 2002 he worked as Assistant Coach (Backs and Skills) at Stade Français, first under Head Coach Nick Mallett and from 2004/05 with Fabien Galthié. During his tenure, Stade reached the Final of the French Championship three years running, winning in 2002/03 and 2003/04, and losing in extra time to Biarritz Olympique in 2004/05. Stade Français were also finalists in the 2005 Heineken Cup.

Meehan joined Bath as the new backs coach in June 2006, before being temporarily promoted to head coach in August 2006. His role was made permanent in December 2006 and he went on to lead the club to their first silverware in 10 years, when Bath won the European Challenge Cup in 2008. In October 2009, Meehan signed a contract extension, to keep him at Bath until 2012. However, following the appointment of Sir Ian McGeechan as director of rugby at the club in 2010, and his subsequent assumption of responsibility for coaching, Meehan and the club reached an agreement whereby he would leave at the end of the 2010/11 season

Returning to Australia, Meehan joined the Western Force on a one-year deal for the 2013 Super Rugby season as attack coach under Michael Foley. At the end of 2013, Meehan signed with the Queensland Reds as attack coach for the 2014 Super Rugby season. He was appointed as head coach of the Queensland Country team for the inaugural season of Australia's National Rugby Championship in 2014.

Meehan joined Toulon as an assistant coach for the 2015–16 season of the Top 14 in France.

Meehan joined Japanese Top League side, the Kintetsu Liners, as Backs Coach under Head Coach Akira Tsuboi in April 2017.

References

External links

Living people
Australian rugby union players
Australian rugby union coaches
1966 births